Vinstre is a lake in Innlandet county, Norway. The  lake lies in Øystre Slidre Municipality and the very western tip of the lake crosses over into the neighboring Vang Municipality. Vinstre was regulated in connection with the construction of the Øvre Vinstra hydroelectric power plant. The lake Bygdin flows into this lake and on the opposite end, it flows out into the dammed lake Sandvatnet/Kaldfjorden/Øyvatnet which is the headwaters for the river Vinstra.

Along its northern shore runs the Jotunheimvegen summer toll road, built in the 1950s as a result of hydroelectricity development affecting the operation of the earlier milk boat service.

Name
The name of the lake is (maybe) derived from the verb  which means "bend", "twist", or "wind" with the suffix -str added to the end. The name is therefore referring to the twisted shape of the lake. The river Vinstra starts from the lake.

See also
List of lakes in Norway

References

Øystre Slidre
Vang, Innlandet
Lakes of Innlandet